Velleia connata is an erect annual herb in the family Goodeniaceae, and is found in all mainland states and territories of Australia.
It grows on sandplains and stony hills in Beard's eremaean province. Its flowers are yellow-brown or white-pink and it flowers mainly from February or May to October.

The species was first described as Velleia connata in 1854 by the botanist, Ferdinand von Mueller, and the name has not been revised.

Gallery

References

External links 
 The Australasian Virtual Herbarium – Distribution
 PlantNET – Description

connata
Flora of Queensland
Flora of New South Wales
Eudicots of Western Australia
Flora of Victoria (Australia)
Flora of the Northern Territory
Flora of South Australia
Taxa named by Ferdinand von Mueller
Plants described in 1854